Heinrich Ernst Walter Schulz (21 July 1893 in Saalfeld – 5 June 1979 in Eltville) was a German officer and political assassin. He was an accomplice of Heinrich Tillessen on 26 August 1921, when the murder of German politician Matthias Erzberger took place.

Life

Youth, World War I and Freikorps time 
In his youth Schulz visited spent four years at the public school, followed by a further four years at the gymnasium in Saalfeld and three years at secondary school in Jena. After his exams, he undertook a commercial apprenticeship at a machine factory and iron foundry in Saalfeld.

At the beginning of First World War, Schulz volunteered for military service. During the war, in which he fought through until the end, he was wounded three times and commended several times. When the war ended, he was discharged from service with the rank of Lieutenant. His demobilization took place in December 1918 in Rudolstadt.

Afterwards, Schulz returned to his parents' house and resumed his old job at the Saalfeld engine works and iron foundry. In April 1919, he joined the Marinebrigade Ehrhardt. These Freikorps were organized to combat the left's revolutionary aspirations. With the marine brigade, he was successively employed in Munich, Hof and Berlin. In March 1920, he also participated in the occupation of Berlin's government district during the Kapp Putsch.

After the dissolution of the Marinebrigade, Schulz was, from April 1921, a member of the Organization Consul, a nationalist secret society, which in many ways was the successor of the Marinebrigade and tried to destabilizise the Weimar Republic.

Assassination of Erzberger 
On behalf of the Organisation Consul, on 26 August 1921, Schulz, together with Henry Tillessen, murdered the centrist politician and former Finance Minister Matthias Erzberger at Bad Griesbach in the Black Forest. Erzberger, as head of the German Armistice Commission on 11 November 1918, had signed the ceasefire agreement of Compiègne. As a result, right-wing and national groups hated Erzberger and called him a November-thug.

Flight and emigration
Schulz fled shortly after the assassination to Hungary, along with Tillesen, and was pursued for murder by Hermann Berchtold. He was recognized in 1924 and arrested. As the Hungarian government refused his extradition, he was released but expelled from the country. As a result, he went via Italy to South-West Africa and later to Spanish Guinea, where he lived as a plantation manager from 1926 to 1932. Due to malaria disease, he traveled in 1932 or 1933 for recovery to Barcelona. To get better health, he returned in March or April 1933 to Germany.

Life in the Nazi state (1933 through 1945) 
Shortly before or shortly after his return to Germany, Schulz was granted amnesty by the impunity regulation from 21 March 1933, which was signed by Paul von Hindenburg.

In May or June 1933 Schulz joined the SS, and he joined the Nazi Party in June 1937.

From the end of 1933 to 1934, Schulz was as Untersturmführer rod guide in the SS-section XXX in Kassel. He left this position after clashes with his superior, Unger. Instead, he was transferred to the SS upper section Rhine in Koblenz, where he worked in the administration. With the reorganization of the upper sections in January 1936, he joined the SS upper section Fulda-Werra in Arolsen. Initially employed in the administration, in 1938 he was appointed welfare referent. He was successively promoted to Sturmbannführer and Obersturmbannführer.

On 15 April 1940 Schulz was taken into the Waffen SS, where he was employed as a welfare officer in the Waffen-SS and police in the military district II (Kassel). In this position, he was concerned with the care of wounded members of the Waffen SS and the supply of survivors. In regional terms, he was subordinated to the SS Group Leader Josias Erbprinz zu Waldeck-Pyrmont.

Postwar
When the war ended in May 1945, Schulz entered American captivity. As a result, he was questioned during the Nuremberg Trials as a witness. Through this, his involvement in Erzberger's murder became apparent. In November 1946, the Baden Attorney General requested the transfer of the case to the competent Baden law enforcement authorities. However, this did not take place immediately, as the de-nazification process continued. Heinrich Schulz was subsequently sentenced to eight years forced labor. In December 1949, he was handed over to the German authorities and sent to custody in Offenburg.

The procedures for Erzberger's murder trial took place from 17 to 19 July 1950 at the district Court in Offenburg. Heinrich Tillessen was heard as a witness and, to Schulz's relief, portrayed himself as the main culprit. It has nevertheless been established that at least one deadly shot to the head came from Schulz's weapon. As a consequence, Heinrich Schulz was convicted of manslaughter and not for murder. The sentence was twelve years' imprisonment.

On 22 December 1952, the sentence was suspended. Heinrich Schulz lived afterwards in Frankfurt am Main.

Literature 
 Cord Gebhardt: Der Fall des Erzberger-Mörders Heinrich Tillessen. Ein Beitrag zur Justizgeschichte nach 1945. Mohr Siebeck, Tübingen 1995,  (Beiträge zur Rechtsgeschichte des 20. Jahrhunderts. Nr. 14).
 Reiner Haehling von Lanzenauer: Der Mord an Matthias Erzberger. Verlag der Gesellschaft für Kulturhistorische Dokumentation, Karlsruhe 2008,  (Schriftenreihe des Rechtshistorischen Museums Karlsruhe. Heft 14).

References 

1893 births
1979 deaths
Organisation Consul members
German assassins
20th-century Freikorps personnel
Waffen-SS personnel
Kapp Putsch participants